Michael Edward Rainton Bassett  (born 28 August 1938) is a former Labour Party member of the New Zealand House of Representatives and cabinet minister in the reformist fourth Labour government. He is also a noted New Zealand historian, and has published a number of books on New Zealand politics, including biographies of Prime Ministers Peter Fraser, Gordon Coates and Joseph Ward.

Life before politics
Bassett was born on 28 August 1938 in Auckland, the son of Clare Bassett (née Brown) and Edward Bassett, and educated at Owairaka School, Dilworth School, Mt Albert Grammar, and the University of Auckland. He completed BA and MA degrees in history at the University of Auckland before winning a fellowship to Duke University in the United States in 1961. He completed a PhD in American history there, completing a dissertation entitled The Socialist Party of America, 1912–1919: Years of Decline.

In 1964, Bassett returned to New Zealand and became a senior lecturer in history at the University of Auckland. During this time he was a member of the Princes Street Labour branch.

Political career

In 1971 Bassett was elected to the Auckland City Council. In the following year, he was elected as a Labour MP for Waitemata in the 1972 election, and the Labour Party became the government for the first time since 1960. Following the death of Prime Minister Norman Kirk in 1974 the party (and Bassett) were defeated in the following (1975) election. In his account of the Third Labour Government, Bassett described it as one of "the most active and socially responsible governments of the twentieth century." He distinguished himself as one of the better performing backbenchers in the government and during its term he assisted Henry May, the Minister of Local Government, in local body amalgamation. Following his defeat, Bassett was asked about the Labour candidacy for the Nelson by-election, which took place only months afterwards, but he ruled it out saying he was not interested in Nelson and "nor would Nelson be interested in me."

Bassett was elected to the Te Atatu electorate in the 1978 election, holding the seat until 1990. Soon after returning to Parliament, he was appointed Shadow Minister of Internal Affairs, Local Government and Sport & Recreation. In a reshuffle in March 1981 he was instead appointed Shadow Minister for Health. Bassett was vocally critical of party president Jim Anderton (particularly after Anderton was ejected from the head office of Air New Zealand during an industrial dispute) and declared he would challenge him for the presidency of the party. An open conflict drew the ire of others in the party and eventually Bassett withdrew his candidacy. He was still subsequently dumped from the shadow cabinet in February 1982.

In 1984, an electoral landslide in favour of Labour resulted in New Zealand's fourth Labour government (in office: 1984–1990). David Lange appointed Bassett Minister of Health and Minister of Local Government. As Minister of Local Government he imposed electoral reforms on councils to use a ward system for local electoral districts, replacing the more commonplace at large system. The government enacted a major programme of economic and social reform, the economic arm of which became known as Rogernomics. Major social reforms included the decriminalisation of homosexuality in the Homosexual Law Reform Act 1986. Bassett wholeheartedly supported the social reforms.

After winning a second term, Bassett retained only the Local Government portfolio but was appointed Minister of Internal Affairs, Civil Defence and Arts and Culture in 1987. Bassett also served as chairman of the New Zealand Lottery Grants Board and of the 1990 Commission, tasked with the commemoration of the 150th anniversary of the signing of the Treaty of Waitangi. In his capacity as Minister of Internal Affairs he also helped to reorganise Waitangi Day celebrations and to encourage them around New Zealand.

When Lange's replacement as Prime Minister Geoffrey Palmer held a complete reelection of cabinet in early 1990 all members of the cabinet not contesting the next election (such as Bassett) were discouraged from standing. After leaving the cabinet he was selected to represent the New Zealand government at the Commonwealth Parliamentary Association held in Zimbabwe in September 1990.

When the government and party schismed over issues of economic reform, Bassett took the side of finance minister Roger Douglas, the main architect of the reforms. In 1990, Labour was defeated in another landslide election. Bassett did not contest the 1990 election, and retired from active politics.

He continued occasionally to be involved at an advisory level, for example unofficially advising Don Brash during Brash's term (2003–2006) as National Party leader. Bassett's switch of sides reflects the present-day Labour Party's semi-repudiation of Rogernomics.

Career after politics
Bassett resumed his academic career, publishing several books on New Zealand political history, and contributing to the Dictionary of New Zealand Biography and the British Dictionary of National Biography. He worked for two years with New Zealand's Expo team in the run up to the Seville Expo '92. He was a professor of history at the University of Western Ontario on and off from 1992 to 1996, taught at the Auckland University Medical School from 1997 to 2000, and was a Fulbright Professor of New Zealand Studies at Georgetown University, Washington, D.C.

From 1994 to 2004 Bassett was a member of the Waitangi Tribunal, which investigates breaches of the Treaty of Waitangi.

He was a columnist for The Dominion Post in Wellington (until late 2006) and The Press in Christchurch.

An article by Bassett in The Northland Age was withdrawn by NZME in March 2021 after Bassett criticised the "bizarre craze" of New Zealand adopting Māori language words and phrases, such as using Aotearoa to refer to the country.

Scholarship
In his article The Essentials of Successful Political Leadership in Twentieth Century New Zealand Politics, Bassett outlined the factors he thought were required for a Prime Minister to be successful. These factors include robust health, high energy levels, a good temperament, intelligence, a willingness to take the right, as opposed to the politically expedient, decision, a modicum of luck, a supportive spouse and charisma.

Personal life
In 1964, Bassett married Judith Petrie, who went on to become a historian at the University of Auckland and a member of the Auckland Regional Council. She had also been a member of the Auckland Hospital Board. The couple had two children.

Bassett is a third cousin of late Prime Minister David Lange. Bassett had suggested that Lange should stand on the Labour ticket for the Auckland City Council in 1974. The council was dominated by conservative interests and the only Labour candidates elected were Jim Anderton and Catherine Tizard; Lange was "halfway down the field .... which was better than I expected". Lange's father, who was a doctor, had delivered Bassett. Lange wrote (presumably jokingly referring to Bassett's appointment to Cabinet and their later disagreements): "My father had delivered him, and it became plain in later days that he must have dropped him ...."

Honours
Bassett was awarded the New Zealand 1990 Commemoration Medal. In the 1992 Queen's Birthday Honours, Bassett was appointed a Companion of the Queen's Service Order for public services. He was made a Companion of the New Zealand Order of Merit, for services as an historian, in the 2018 New Year Honours.

Published works

 Bassett, Michael, Confrontation '51: the 1951 Waterfront Dispute (1972)
 Bassett, Michael, The Third Labour Government (1976) 

 Bassett, Michael, Sir Joseph Ward (1993);

 Bassett, Michael, The Mother of All Departments: A History of the Department of Internal Affairs (1997)
 Bassett, Michael, The State in New Zealand 1840–1984: Socialism Without Doctrines? (1998)
 Bassett, Michael and King, Michael, Tomorrow Comes the Song: A life of Peter Fraser (2001)
 Bassett and Bassett, Judith, Roderick Deane: His Life & Times (2006)
 Bassett, Michael and Goldsmith, Paul, The Myers (2007)
 Bassett, Michael, Working with David (2008)
 Bassett, Michael and Goldsmith, Paul, Puketutu and its People (2008)
 Bassett, Michael, City of Sails: The History of Auckland City Council, 1989–2010 (2013)

Notes

References

External links

 Personal website
 Photo of the Fish and Chip Brigade in 1980 in Douglas’ office; Bassett, Douglas, Lange and Moore

|-

|-

1938 births
Companions of the New Zealand Order of Merit
Companions of the Queen's Service Order
Duke University alumni
Living people
Auckland City Councillors
Members of the Cabinet of New Zealand
New Zealand biographers
Male biographers
20th-century New Zealand historians
New Zealand Labour Party MPs
University of Auckland alumni
Academic staff of the University of Auckland
People educated at Mount Albert Grammar School
Members of the New Zealand House of Representatives
New Zealand MPs for Auckland electorates
Unsuccessful candidates in the 1975 New Zealand general election
Unsuccessful candidates in the 1969 New Zealand general election
Unsuccessful candidates in the 1966 New Zealand general election
21st-century New Zealand historians
Members of the Waitangi Tribunal
People educated at Dilworth School